Joanne E Gough (born 17 November 1964) is a retired British rower who competed at the 1988 Summer Olympics.

Rowing career
Gough represented England and won a silver medal in the eight and a bronze medal in the coxed four, at the 1986 Commonwealth Games in Edinburgh, Scotland. She was a member of the eight that won the national title rowing for a A.R.A squad at the 1987 National Championships.

She was selected to represent Great Britain in the women's coxed four event at the 1988 Olympic Games in Seoul. The team which consisted of Gough, Kate Grose, Fiona Johnston, Susan Smith and Alison Norrish finished in sixth place.

She was part of the coxless pairs with Annabel Eyres that won the national title rowing for the British squad at the 1990 National Championships.

References

External links
 

1964 births
Living people
British female rowers
Olympic rowers of Great Britain
Rowers at the 1988 Summer Olympics
People from Nantwich
Commonwealth Games medallists in rowing
Commonwealth Games silver medallists for England
Commonwealth Games bronze medallists for England
Rowers at the 1986 Commonwealth Games
Medallists at the 1986 Commonwealth Games